The 2010 Challenge Trophy was hosted in Charlottetown, Prince Edward Island on 6 to 10 October 2010.  Defending champion Hellas SC of Manitoba failed to qualify as they lost to Lucania SC in the semi-final round in the Manitoba play down.

Seeding
The seeding is based on the results from the previous year. New Brunswick did not send a team this year so the host gained a second entry.

Manitoba
Quebec
Prince Edward Island
Alberta
British Columbia
Newfoundland Labrador
Nova Scotia
Saskatchewan
Ontario
Prince Edward Island 2 (Guest team)

Teams
Group 1
1.  Winnipeg Lucania FC
4.  Calgary Dinosaurs
5.  Gorge FC
8.  Huskie Alumni
9.  AEK London FC

Group 2
2.  Royal Select de Beauport
3. 1 Churchill Arms
6.  Holy Cross Kirby
7.  Halifax Dunbrack
10. 2 PEI Selects

tba (ON) Final scheduled for 19-Sep-2010 Official Site
tba (NL) There are six team playing for the right to represent NL - Holy Cross, St. Lawrence Laurentians, Mt. Pearl, Feildians, CB Auto Strikers FC, Western United FC.

Schedule and results

Rosters

Gorge FC

In the provincial final, Karpati's squad

Halifax Dunbrack

PEI Selects

Churchill Arms

Qualifiers
The following are details of each of the provincial finals that will determine each representative.  New Brunswick is serving a suspension , so PEI as host will get 2 teams.  List of Challenge Trophy 2010 teams

References

Notes

General
 
Challenge Trophy Schedule
Alberta Qualifier
News Preview
News Preview
Strong start for PEI at soccer nationals
Dunbrack men open with win at soccer nationals

Canadian National Challenge Cup
Canadian
Chall
Sport in Charlottetown
Canadian Challenge